Buzzanca is a surname of Italian origin. Notable people with the surname include:

 Gino Buzzanca (1912–1985), Italian actor
 Lando Buzzanca (1935-2022), Italian actor
 Matteo Buzzanca (born 1973), Italian musician, composer, and record producer

Italian-language surnames